The 1986 Arkansas Razorbacks football team represented the University of Arkansas during the 1986 NCAA Division I-A football season.

Schedule

Personnel

Rankings

Game summaries

Texas A&M

vs. Oklahoma (Orange Bowl)

Awards

 All-Americans: Greg Horne (AFCA, 1st)
 All-SWC: Steve Atwater (1st), Freddie Childress (1st), James Shibest (1st)

References

Arkansas
Arkansas Razorbacks football seasons
Arkansas Razorbacks football